Akaitorino Musume, (foaled 16 April 2018) is a Japanese Thoroughbred racehorse. A daughter of two Japanese Triple Crown winners she showed promise as a two-year-old in 2020 when she won two of her three starts. In the following year she won the Daily Hai Queen Cup and ran well in both the Oka Sho and the Yushun Himba before winning the Shuka Sho.

Background
Akaitorino Musume is a bay filly with a white blaze and three white socks bred in Japan by Northern Farm. The horse entered the ownership of Makoto Kaneko and was sent into training with Sakae Kunieda. Her name can be translated as Daughter of the Red Bird, because she is a daughter of Apapane who was named after a native Hawaiian red bird. 

She was from the eleventh crop of foals sired by Deep Impact, who was the Japanese Horse of the Year in 2005 and 2006, winning races including the Tokyo Yushun, Tenno Sho, Arima Kinen and Japan Cup. Deep Impact's other progeny include Gentildonna, Harp Star, Kizuna, A Shin Hikari, Marialite and Saxon Warrior. Akaitorino Musume was the fifth foal produced by Apapane, an outstanding racemare whose wins included the Hanshin Juvenile Fillies, Oka Sho, Yushun Himba, Shuka Sho and Victoria Mile. Apapane's dam Salty Bid was an American-bred mare who raced in Japan and won three times as well as finishing second in the Grade 3 Fairy Stakes. She was a distant female-line descendant of the influential American broodmare Escutcheon.

Racing career

2020: two-year-old season
Akaitorino Musume made her debut in a contest for previously unraced two-year-olds over 1600 metres on Going at Niigata Racecourse on 2 August when she started the 1.5/1 favourite but came home seventh of the eighteen runners behind the colt Havasu, beaten more than seven lengths by the winner. On 17 October at Tokyo Racecourse the filly went off second favourite for a maiden race over 1600 metres at Tokyo Racecourse. Ridden as on her first start by Keita Tosaki she recorded her first success as she came from seventh place on the final turn to win by a length from Reve de la Prairie. Takeshi Yokoyama took the ride when Akaitorino Musume started favourite for the Akamatsu Sho over the same course and distance on 22 November and won by one and a quarter lengths from May Thousand Hour after coming from ninth place on the last turn.

2021: three-year-old season
On her first appearance as a three-year-old Akaitorino Musume was moved up to contest the Grade 3 Daily Hai Queen Cup (a trial race for the Oka Sho) over 1600 metres at Tokyo on 13 February when she started 3.9/1 second favourite behind Kukuna. Ridden by Tosaki, she settled behind the leaders before taking the lead inside the last 200 metres and prevailed in a tight finish, winning by a neck from Art de Vivre with Kukuna, A Shin Hiten and Isn't She Lovely close behind. Sakae Kunieda commented "she was able to get a good position, keep up well, and though she made her move a bit early, she ran really well. I was able to watch with no anxiety."

In the Grade 1 Oka Sho over 1600 metres at Hanshin Racecourse on 11 April Akaitorino Musume, with Yokoyama in the saddle, started the 9.5/1 fourth choice in the betting. She was in contention from the start and kept on well in the straight to finish fourth behind Sodashi, Satono Reinas and Fine Rouge, beaten a length by the winner. The filly was then moved up in distance to contest the 2400 metre Yushun Himba at Tokyo on 23 May when she was ridden by Christophe Lemaire and started second favourite behind Sodashi. After settling in sixth place she lost her position on the final turn and was boxed in early in the straight before finding a gap on the inside and finishing strongly to take second place, a length behind the winner Uberleben.

After a summer break of almost five months Akaitorino Musume returned to the track in the Shuka Sho over 2000 metres at Hanshin on 17 October. Ridden by Tosaki she started the 7.9/1 fourth choice in the betting behind Sodashi, Fine Rouge and Andvaranaut (Rose Stakes) in a sixteen-runner field which also included Uberleben, Art de Vivre, A Shin Hiten, Cool Cat (Flora Stakes) and Ho O Ixelles (Flower Cup). Akaitorino Musume settled in sixth place as A Shin Hiten set the pace from Sodashi before making a sustained run on the outside in the straight. She overtook the tiring A Shin Hiten 100 metres from the finish and kept on well in the closing stages to win by half a length from Fine Rouge with Andvaranaut the same distance away in third place. After the race Tosaki said "I was able to settle the filly in good position and race her in good rhythm. She responded willingly and stretched really well in the lane. I think she is a strong horse and felt that she has stepped up to the next level. I look forward to her performances going forward".

On 15 November Akaitorino Musume was matched against older fillies and mares in the Grade 1 Queen Elizabeth II Cup over 2200 metres at Hanshin and started second favourite behind Lei Papale. After tracking the leaders she was obstructed as she attempted to make progress in the straight and finished seventh behind the 64/1 outsider Akai Ito.

2022: four-year old season 
Akaitorino Musume was set to run at the Hanshin Himba Stakes on April 9th of that year, but cancelled the race at the last minute due to her right rear leg becoming lame. It was later revealed her right third phalanx was broken, and was subsequently retired from racing not long after.

Pedigree

References

2018 racehorse births
Racehorses bred in Japan
Racehorses trained in Japan
Thoroughbred family 9-f